Zarechny is a rural locality (a village) in Krasnoulsky Selsoviet, Gafuriysky District, Bashkortostan, Russia. The population was 78 as of 2010. There are 5 streets.

Geography 
Zarechny is located 6 km northwest of Krasnousolsky (the district's administrative centre) by road. Krasnousolsky is the nearest rural locality.

References 

Rural localities in Gafuriysky District